Nikola Sukacev (born 24 February 1998) is a Swiss professional footballer who plays as a midfielder for Kriens.

Professional career
Sukacev is a sole youth product of Grasshoppers, having joined their academy in 2007. Sukacev made his debut for Grasshoppers in a Swiss Super League 1–1 tie with BSC Young Boys on 10 December 2017, wherein he scored his side's only goal. Sukacev signed his first professional contract with Grasshoppers on 29 January 2018.

On 26 July 2021, he returned to Kriens.

International career
Sukacev was born in Switzerland and is of Serbian descent. He is a youth international for Switzerland, but remains eligible for Serbia.

References

External links
 
 SFL Profile
 Switzerland U15 Profile
 Switzerland U17 Profile
 Switzerland U20 Profile

1998 births
Swiss people of Serbian descent
Footballers from Zürich
Living people
Swiss men's footballers
Switzerland youth international footballers
Association football midfielders
Grasshopper Club Zürich players
SC Kriens players
FK Metalac Gornji Milanovac players
Swiss Super League players
Swiss Challenge League players
Swiss expatriate footballers
Expatriate footballers in Serbia
Swiss expatriate sportspeople in Serbia